Rüdiger Schnuphase (born 23 January 1954 in Werningshausen) is a German former football player.

Schnuphase played for FC Rot-Weiß Erfurt (1971–1976), FC Carl Zeiss Jena (1976–1984) and again FC Rot-Weiß Erfurt (1984–1986).

On the national level he played for East Germany national team (45 matches/6 goals), and was a participant at the 1974 FIFA World Cup. Schnuphase played in two matches in Gelsenkirchen at football's biggest stage.

In 1982, he won the award for the GDR Footballer of the Year.

References

External links

 Weltfussball  
 

1954 births
Living people
German footballers
East German footballers
1974 FIFA World Cup players
Footballers at the 1980 Summer Olympics
Olympic footballers of East Germany
Olympic silver medalists for East Germany
FC Rot-Weiß Erfurt players
FC Carl Zeiss Jena players
East Germany international footballers
Olympic medalists in football
FC Rot-Weiß Erfurt managers
DDR-Oberliga players
Recipients of the Patriotic Order of Merit in silver
Medalists at the 1980 Summer Olympics
Association football midfielders
East German football managers
People from Sömmerda (district)
Footballers from Thuringia
People from Bezirk Erfurt